List of towns, together with their population as recorded by the Census of 2006. Towns with fewer than 1,000 people are not listed.

References

 
Towns